Grenville Christian College is a former private boarding school located in the rural community of Maitland, some  northeast of Brockville, Ontario, on the bank of the St. Lawrence River.
"

The independent university preparatory school was composed of upper, middle, elementary and primary schools. Students had the option of being day students, full-time boarders or weekday boarders.

History
The campus was built in 1918 as St. Mary's College, a preparatory school run by the Redemptorist Order of the Roman Catholic Church. St. Mary's College operated until 1968.

The St. Mary's College campus was purchased in 1969 by a group called Berean Christian Schools, who envisioned using the facility for training missionaries. Although the exact time line is unclear, Berean Christian Schools began as a private school in 1969 and was renamed Grenville Christian College in 1973.

After 37 years, Grenville Christian College announced its closure on July 30, 2007, citing declining enrollment and unspecified financial pressures. A "Closing Celebration Weekend" was held on the weekend of September 29–30, 2007.

Controversy
In 1981, the school was noted as having ties to the Community of Jesus, a controversial Benedictine sect in Cape Cod, Massachusetts, characterized as a "charismatic fellowship" in a report commissioned by the Boston Presbytery, which subsequently declined to designate the group an Episcopal community. Grenville's co-founders were all members of the Community of Jesus, including pastors Betty and Charles Farnsworth, the latter of whom also served as headmaster, and fellow headmaster J. Alastair Haig and his wife, Mary Florence Mollard Haig; all four were named in the lawsuit. Described as a cult, its influence became central to a successful 2006 class-action lawsuit against the school.

CTV Television Network broadcast a documentary film on February 6, 2016, in tandem with the launch of the book, Grenville, by Andrew J. Hale-Byrne, which highlighted the close relationship between the Anglican Diocese of Ontario and Grenville Christian College which has now become an established fact in court, and that the Ontario Provincial Police investigation into abuse of students has been reopened. Toronto Star''' followed up this reporting on February 29, 2016, wherein students reported that they had been punched in the groin and urinated on by staff, among other abuses mentioned. The Ontario Provincial Police criminal investigation into abuse by former staff is ongoing. The Crown laid their first charges on October 6, 2016, for sexual assault. Robert Farnsworth, son of the founding family, was arrested on October 5, 2016, then cleared of the allegations.

Students alleged extreme and bizarre humiliations. Dan Michielsen enrolled at the college in 1985 when he was 15 years old. In an interview with the Star, he said that by the time he left four years later, he was ‘a wreck.’ He alleged that two weeks after arriving at Grenville a staff member woke him up by punching him in the groin, an apparent punishment for talking in his sleep. Michielsen said he was then dragged into the washroom and forced to clean it with a toothbrush. The staff member urinated on him as he scrubbed the floor, he said. Michielsen said he was often berated by staff, who called him ‘disgusting,’ ‘evil,’ a ‘pig,’ and a ‘mutt.’ Now 46, he says he has been left with debilitating self-esteem problems as a result of the alleged abuse. ‘After a while, I just accepted that I was a loser, that I was a s---, that I should just shut my mouth,’ he said. ‘The doubt is always there.’"

Previously, there had been allegations of student abuse and cult practices at the school that were ultimately dismissed by the Anglican Diocese of Ontario. The church went on record rejecting calls to investigate of misconduct complaints against school officials due to the OPP Investigation, but the church considered the possibility of sanctioning an ordained minister who was headmaster of the College for two decades.
 In September 2007, the Ontario Provincial Police began investigating two former headmasters who were also Anglican priests. The chair of the school's Board of Directors and the Bishop of the Diocese of Ontario denied that the school was ever formally affiliated with the Anglican Church of Canada. Anglican priests and bishops, had often officiated at the school's chapel services, as did representatives of other denominations. The school chose to fly the Anglican flag.

Since the school's closing, some former students have claimed punishments by silence and separation ("Discipline"), a form of internal suspension, as well as being woken in the middle of the night by having bright light shone in their faces and being interrogated about their alleged "sins". The former co-publisher of a local newspaper, The Recorder & Times, has stated that his newspaper became aware of allegations of religious cult practices at Grenville Christian College in the late 1980s, but was unable to convince anyone to publicize the story. The paper was also threatened with libel action by a Bay Street law firm.

According to some students in a The Globe and Mail'' article: "the school was almost literally two communities, with one group – overseas students and the sons and daughters of wealthy Ontario families – not knowing what was happening to the other group – children with behaviour problems ... and the children of staff." Some staff children claim to have been treated the most harshly. The acting chairman of the school's Board of Directors formally apologized to students who felt they had been abused at any time in the school's history. In 2007, certain former students, including Mr. Hale- Byrne, commenced a class actions as against Grenville, its principals, Farnsworth and Haig and the Diocese of Ontario.claiming abuse of students. A second amended lawsuit was filed in January 2008.

In November 2008, following an investigation, the Ontario Provincial Police announced that there would be no charges laid involving the historical abuse allegations. "The OPP, in consultation with the Crown attorney, have decided not to lay any criminal charges in relation to the extensive investigation," the OPP said in a statement. "It wasn't in the interest of the public to lay any charges," said OPP Sgt. Kristine Rae in an interview with The Recorder and Times. "When you're looking at historical allegations, you're looking at the whole picture."

New York musician Michael Phelan, the son of a former Grenville headmaster and a former student at the school, talked with the OPP at length about his treatment by school staff. Mr. Phelan said: "I understand that it's notoriously difficult to prosecute child abuse cases. But at the same time, it doesn't mean that these things didn't really happen. It doesn't mean that I wasn't abused, that many students weren't abused. And I don't regret coming forward. I hope nobody does."

Conversely, other alumni agree that there were extremely strict aspects to the school but would not categorize them as abusive. On September 3, 2007, the Globe and Mail published a letter to the editor from a former GCC student, Bruce Mackinnon (entitled "The Kind of School It Was"). He wrote: "I object in the strongest terms about your depiction of Grenville Christian College. In every kind of school, mistakes are made. I can assure you, the vast majority of the staff were kind, with only the best interests of the kids at heart. None of the kids expected rigid rules of conduct, but that was the kind of school it was, it was needed. I am one of the many kids who went through there and came out alive and will be ever grateful to the staff and God. I hold no ill will toward the staff members... Everyone learns in life as they go, none of us are perfect."

In 2012, Justice Perell dismissed all the claims against the Diocese, holding that "Grenville Christian College was the enterprise of Fathers Haig and Farnsworth, and the Diocese ... had no power or control or legal right to intervene in the operation of the school"  (Per Perell J, Cavanaugh v. Grenville Christian College, 2012 ONSC 2995 (CanLII) 27 CPC (7th) 271, upheld by the Ontario Court of Appeal Cavanaugh v. Grenville Christian College, 2013 ONCA 139 (CanLII), 0 DLR (4th) 670, 304 OAC 163, 32 CPC (7th) 1, [2013] OJ No 1007 (QL).). The action as against Grenville, Farnsworth and Haig was allowed to proceed.

In February 2020, after a trial that spanned two months, former students won the class action lawsuit against the former Grenville Christian College for the physical, sexual and extreme emotional abuse and demeaning discipline and humiliation they and others say they endured during the college's 24 years of operation. Justice Janet Leiper of the Ontario Superior Court of Justice said the college and the estates of two deceased former headmasters will have to pay yet-to-be-determined punitive damages.

References

External links

Educational institutions established in 1970
Educational institutions disestablished in 2007
Education in Leeds and Grenville United Counties
Private schools in Ontario
Boarding schools in Ontario
Anglican schools in Canada
Preparatory schools in Ontario
Buildings and structures in Leeds and Grenville United Counties